Phytophthora cajani is a species of water mould that infects pigeon pea (Cajanus cajan). It was first described in 1978.

References

cajani
Water mould plant pathogens and diseases
Species described in 1978